The 2017 Rugby Europe Women’s U18 Sevens Championship is the fourth edition of the championship. It was held in Vichy France in September. England won their third title after defeating Wales 31–0 in the final.

Teams

Pool stages

Pool A

Pool B

Pool C

Finals 
Challenge Finals

5th/8th Place Playoff

Cup Finals

Final standings

References 

2017–18 in European women's rugby union